This is an alphabetical list of songs written or co-written by the American singer-songwriter Paul Simon, with dates of their composition (as close an approximation as possible).

#
 "7 O'Clock News/Silent Night" (1966)
 "50 Ways To Leave Your Lover" (1975)
 "The 59th Street Bridge Song (Feelin' Groovy)" (1966)

A
 "Ace In The Hole" (1979)
 "Adios Hermanos" (1995)
 "All Around The World Or The Myth Of Fingerprints" (1986)
 "Allergies" (1981)
 "America" (1968)
 "American Tune" (1973)
 "Anna Belle" (as Jerry Landis, 1959)
 "Another Galaxy" (2005)
 "April Come She Will" (1965)
 "Armistice Day" (1972)
 "At The Zoo" (1966)

B
 "Baby Driver" (1968)
 "Beautiful" (2006)
 "Bernadette" (1996)
 "The Big Bright Green Pleasure Machine" (1966)
 "Bleecker Street" (1963)
 "Blessed" (1965)
 "Bookends Theme" (Two versions, one instrumental, one with vocals, 1968)
 "Born At The Right Time" (1990)
 "Born In Puerto Rico" (1996)
 "The Boxer" (1968)
 "The Boy In The Bubble" (1986)
 "Bridge Over Troubled Water" (1969)

C
 "Can I Forgive Him" (1996)
 "Carlos Dominguez" (as Paul Kane, 1963)
 "Cards Of Love" (as Jerry Landis, 1962; the CD "Tom & Jerry Meets Tico & the Triumphs" credits Burak Brennan)
 "Cars Are Cars" (1983)
 "Cecilia" (1969)
 "A Church Is Burning" (1965)
 "Citizen Of The Planet" (1983)
 "Cloudy" (with Bruce Woodley, 1965)
 "The Clock" (2016)
 "Congratulations" (1971)
 "The Coast" (1990)
 "Cool Papa Bell" (2016)
 "Crazy Love, Vol. II" (1986)
 "Cry, Little Boy, Cry" (as Jerry Landis, 1962)
 "Cuba Si, Nixon No" (1969)

D
 "Dancin' Wild" (as Jerry Landis, and with Art Garfunkel as Tom Graph, 1957)
 "The Dangling Conversation" (1966)
 "Darling Lorraine" (2000)
 "Diamonds On The Soles Of Her Shoes" (1986)
 "Dori Anne" (as Jerry Landis, with David Winters and J. Kay, 1963)
 "Duncan" (1972)

E
 "El Condor Pasa (If I Could)" (English lyric only, 1969)
 "Everything About It Is A Love Song" (2004)
 "Everything Put Together Falls Apart" (1972)
 "Express Train" (as Jerry Landis, 1962)

F
 "Fakin' It" (1967)
 "Father And Daughter" (2002)
 "Flowers Never Bend With The Rainfall" (1965)
 "For Emily, Whenever I May Find Her" (1966)
 "Forever and After" (1962, Recorded under Jerry Landis)
 "Further to Fly" (1990)

G
 "Get Up And Do The Wobble" (as Jerry Landis, 1962)
 "Getting Ready For Christmas Day" (2010)
 "The Girl For Me" (with Art Garfunkel, 1955)
 "God Bless The Absentee" (1980)
 "Gone At Last" (1975)
 "Graceland" (1986)
 "Gumboots" (1986)

H
 "A Hazy Shade Of Winter" (1966)
 "He Was My Brother" (as Paul Kane, 1963)
 "Hearts And Bones" (1983)
 "Hey, Schoolgirl" (as Jerry Landis, and with Art Garfunkel as Tom Graph, 1957)
 "Homeless" (1986)
 "Homeward Bound" (1965)
 "How Can You Live In The Northeast?" (2005)
 "How The Heart Approaches What It Yearns" (1980)
 "Hurricane Eye" (1999)

I
 "I Am A Rock" (1965)
 "I Do It For Your Love" (1975)
 "I Don't Believe" (2005)
 "I Don't Believe Them" (as Jerry Landis, 1961)
 "I Know What I Know" (1986)
 "I Wish I Weren't In Love" (as Jerry Landis, 1962)
 "I Wish You Could Be Here" (with Bruce Woodley, 1965)
 "In A Parade" (2016)
 "In The Garden Of Edie" (2016)
 "Insomniac's Lullaby" (2016)

J
 "Jonah" (1980)
 "Just A Boy" (as Jerry Landis, 1960)

K
 "Kathy's Song" (1965)
 "Keep The Customer Satisfied" (1970)
 "Kodachrome" (1973)

L
 "The Late, Great, Johnny Ace" (1981)
 "Late In The Evening" (1980)
 "Learn How To Fall" (1972)
 "Leaves That Are Green" (1965)
 "Lisa" (as Jerry Landis, 1962)
 "The Lone Teen Ranger" (as Jerry Landis, 1962)
 "Loneliness" (as Jerry Landis, 1959)
 "Long, Long Day" (1980)
 "Love" (2000)
 "Love And Hard Times" (2008)
 "Loves Me Like A Rock" (1973)

M
 "Me And Julio Down By The Schoolyard" (1971)
 "A Most Peculiar Man" (1965)
 "Mother And Child Reunion" (1972)
 "Motorcycle" (as Jerry Landis, with Tico and the Triumphs, 1961)
 "Mrs. Robinson" (1967)
 "My Little Town" (1975)

N
 "Night Game" (1975)
 "Nobody" (1980)
 "Noise" (as Jerry Landis, 1962)
 "The Northern Line" (1965, from Concert in the Barn private recording)

O
 "The Obvious Child" (1990)
 "Oh, Marion" (1980)
 "Old" (2000)
 "Old Friends" (1968)
 "Once Upon A Time There Was An Ocean" (2005)
 "One Man's Ceiling Is Another Man's Floor" (1973)
 "One-Trick Pony" (1979)
 "The Only Living Boy In New York" (1969)
 "Our Song" (as Jerry Landis, and with Art Garfunkel as Tom Graph, 1958)
 "Outrageous" (2003)
 "Overs" (1967)

P
 "Papa Hobo" (1972)
 "Paranoia Blues" (1972)
 "Patterns" (1965)
 "Peace Like A River" (1972)
 "Pigs, Sheep And Wolves" (2000)
 "Play Me A Sad Song" (1961)
 "A Poem On The Underground Wall" (1966)
 "(Pretty Baby) Don't Say Goodbye" (as Jerry Landis, and with Art Garfunkel as Tom Graph, 1958)
 "Proof Of Love" (1990)
 "Punky's Dilemma" (1967)

Q
 "Quality" (1996)
 "Questions For The Angels" (2011)
 "Quiet" (2000)

R
 "Red Rubber Ball" (with Bruce Woodley, 1965)
 "Rene and Georgette Magritte with Their Dog after the War" (1983)
 "Richard Cory" (1965)
 "The Riverbank" (2016)
 "Run That Body Down" (1972)

S
 "Save the Life of My Child" (1967)
 "Shopliftin' Clothes" (1996)
 "Shy" (as Jerry Landis, 1960)
 "The Side Of A Hill" (as Paul Kane, 1963)
 "Silent Eyes" (1975)
 "A Simple Desultory Philippic" (various subtitles, 1965 and 1966)
 "Slip Slidin' Away" (1977)
 "So Long, Frank Lloyd Wright" (1970)
 "Soft Parachutes" (1981)
 "Someday One Day" (recorded by The Seekers) (1965)
 "Something So Right" (1973)
 "Somewhere They Can't Find Me" (1965)
 "Song About The Moon" (1982)
 "Song For The Asking" (1969)
 "The Sound Of Silence" (February 19, 1964)
 "Sparrow" (1964)
 "Spirit Voices" (1990)
 "St. Judy's Comet" (1973)
 "Still Crazy After All These Years" (1975)
 "Stranded In A Limousine" (1977)
 "Stranger To Stranger" (2016)
 "Street Angel" (2016)
 "Sure Don't Feel Like Love" (2004)

T
 "Take Me To The Mardi Gras" (1972)
 "The Teacher" (2000)
 "Teenage Fool" (1958)
 "Tenderness" (1973)
 "Ten Years" (1997)
 "That's Me" (2005)
 "That's My Story" (as Jerry Landis, and with Art Garfunkel as Tom Graph, 1958)
 "That's Where I Belong" (2000)
 "That's Why God Made The Movies" (1980)
 "That Was Your Mother" (1986)
 "Think Too Much (A)" (1983)
 "Think Too Much (B)" (1983)
 "Train In The Distance" (1983)

V
 "The Vampires" (1995)
 "Virgil" (1996)

W
 "Wartime Prayers" (2004)
 "Was A Sunny Day" (1973)
 "Wednesday Morning, 3 A.M." (1964)
 "We've Got A Groovy Thing Goin'" (1965)
 "The Werewolf" (2016)
 "When Numbers Get Serious" (1982)
 "Why Don't You Write Me" (1969)
 "Wild Flower" (as Jerry Landis, 1962)
 "Wristband" (2016)

Y
 "You Can Call Me Al" (1986)
 "You Don't Know Where Your Interest Lies" (1966)
 "You're The One" (2000)

 
Simon, Paul